Federal Route 235, or Jalan Sungai Koyan-Berchang (formerly Pahang State Route C158), is a federal road in Pahang, Malaysia. The roads connects Sungai Koyan in the west to Berchang near Kuala Lipis in the east. It is also a main route to Cameron Highlands from Kuala Lipis. The route starts at Sungai Koyan.

In 2012, the highway was gazetted as Federal Route 235.

Features

The Federal Route 235 was built under the JKR R5 road standard, allowing a maximum speed limit of up to 90 km/h.

List of junctions and towns

References

Malaysian Federal Roads